The 1950 New Mexico gubernatorial election took place on November 7, 1950, in order to elect the Governor of New Mexico. Incumbent Democrat Thomas J. Mabry was term-limited, and could not run for a third consecutive term. David Chávez unsuccessfully sought the Democratic nomination.

General election

Results

References

1950
gubernatorial
New Mexico
November 1950 events in the United States